Cirsium heterophyllum, the melancholy thistle, is an erect spineless herbaceous perennial  flowering plant in the family Asteraceae.  It is native to Europe and western Asia, where it grows in upland meadows, grasslands, road verges and open woodland.

Description

Unusually for a thistle, Cirsium heterophyllum lacks spines. The stem is grooved but unwinged, more-or-less branchless, and cottony. The leaves are green and hairless above, thick white-felted underneath. The upper leaves do not have petioles, clasping the stem with cordate (heart-shaped) bases. The flower heads are 3 to 5 cm long and wide, the flowers red-purple, appearing from July to August.

Distribution
Cirsium heterophyllum is a species of northern Europe and Central Asia. It is native in upland areas of Scotland and northern England and north Wales, but is rare in other parts of Great Britain and Ireland. It is present throughout Scandinavia, in north central Europe and Russia to about 100 degrees East and in the high mountains of southern Europe. It grows in upland grassland and scrub, open woodland and river valleys.

Similar species
Cirsium dissectum (meadow thistle) is a more slender species.

Medical use
The plant was considered a possible cure for sadness. Nicholas Culpepper in 1669 said that it "makes a man as merry as a cricket".

References

heterophyllum
Flora of Europe
Flora of Asia
Plants described in 1753
Taxa named by Carl Linnaeus